Miklós Ybl (6 April 1814 in Székesfehérvár – 22 January 1891 in Budapest) was one of Europe's leading architects in the mid to late nineteenth century as well as Hungary's most influential architect during his career. His most well-known work is the Hungarian State Opera House in Budapest (1875–84).

Background

After graduating from the Institute of Technology in Vienna, Ybl became Mihály Pollack's assistant in 1832 and worked in Henrik Koch's office between 1836 and 1840. Following this, he moved to Munich and studied at the Academy of Fine Arts and then to Italy to study. After his return, he entered into partnership with the son of Mihály Pollack, Ágoston; together they refurbished the Ikervár castle of Count Lajos Batthyány. His first main work was the church in Fót, built between 1845 and 1855.

His early, large projects were built in Romantic style, influenced by eastern motifs. Although Romanesque shapes also occur in his later buildings, after his second study tour to Italy from 1860 he became interested in the possibility of the revitalisation of the Italian Renaissance style, and designed several neo-Renaissance buildings. Many of his buildings became, and indeed are still today, determinant elements of the cityscape of Budapest: Saint Stephen's Basilica (1867–91), the Rác Thermal Bath, the former Palace of Customs, (1871–74), and the throne room and Krisztinaváros wing of the Royal Palace. He also built countless churches, apartments and castles in the provinces.

The annual architectural prize founded in 1953 was named after him in his honor.

2014 was named "Ybl Memorial Year" in Hungary.

Gallery

Major works

 1845–1849. Fót, Károlyi castle rebuilding
 1845–1855. Fót, Roman Catholic church
 cc. 1852. Budapest, Grabovszky – (Rózsa-) villa
 1857–58. Budapest, National stables
 cc. 1860. Albertirsa, Szapáry chapel crypt
 cc. 1860. Leányfalu, Gyulai-villa
 cc. 1860. , Wenckheim castle
 1860–1864. Nagycenk, R.C. church
 from 1862 Kecskemét, Evangelical church
 1862–1865. Budapest, Festetics palace
 1863. Budapest, German theatre (not built)
 from 1863. Budapest, Károly palace
 1863–1864. Budapest, MTA building
 cc. 1865. Fegyvernek, Szapáry castle
 1865–1866. Budapest, old parliament building
 1865–1879. Budapest, R.C. church, Bakáts squ.
 1867. Budapest, Pálffy palace
 1867–1891. Budapest, Szent István basilica. Began by Hild, continued by Ybl and finished by J. Kauser
 1870–1874. Budapest, Customs house
 1871. Budapest, Margit bridge (not built)
 cc. 1872. Parád, Ybl Hotel
 1873–1884. Budapest, Hungarian State Opera House
 1874–1982. Budapest, Castle kiosk and bazaar
 1875–1879. Ókígyós, Wenckheim castle
 1880–1882. Parádsasvár, Károlyi castle
 1880–1891. Budapest, Castle hill remodelling
 1882–1888. Budapest, Budapest Clarisseum R.C. church
 1883–1884. Budapest, Széchenyi palace (demolished)
 cc. 1888. Parád, Erzsébet Hotel
 and other structures in Csurgó, Doboz, Kétegyháza, Lengyeltóti, Mácsa, Marcali, Ókigyós, Surány, etc.

See also 
 List of Hungarian architects

References

External links 

 

1814 births
1891 deaths
People from Székesfehérvár
Hungarian-German people
Burials at Kerepesi Cemetery
19th-century Hungarian architects